Mangelia lastica is a species of sea snail, a marine gastropod mollusk in the family Mangeliidae.

Description
The length of the shell attains 4.5 mm, its diameter 2 mm.

(Original description) The short, small, shell is polished, whitish and solid. It has a large protoconch of 1½ whorl and 3½ subsequent whorls. The suture is distinct, not appressed. The fasciole is inconspicuous. The whorls are moderately rounded. The aperture is about half the whole length. The axial sculpture consists of more or less obscure folds, stronger on the early whorls, seldom differentiated into distinct ribs, sometimes forming a rounded shoulder to the whorls.  Beside these there are irregularly distributed incremental lines. There is no indication of any spiral sculpture. The aperture is narrow.  The anal sulcus is hardly evident. The outer lip is straight, thin or very slightly thickened. The columella is straight, the axis not pervious.

Distribution
This marine species was found off Fernandina, Florida, USA.

References

External links
 Smithsonian Institution: Mangilia lastica
  Tucker, J.K. 2004 Catalog of recent and fossil turrids (Mollusca: Gastropoda). Zootaxa 682:1–1295.

loraeformis
Gastropods described in 1927